Lesina is a genus of bush cricket in the tribe Agraeciini.  Species in this genus are known as 'dragon headed katydids'. They are native to tropical Asia including Malaysia, Indonesia and Borneo, while they are endemic to Croatia. They are listed as endangered on the IUCN Red List of Threatened Species due to a continuing decline of mature individuals.

Species 
The Orthoptera Species File lists:
subgenus Ellatodon Caudell, 1927
Lesina blanchardi (Brongniart, 1890)
Lesina maxima Gorochov & Berezin, 2016
subgenus Lesina Walker, 1869
Lesina ensifera (Brullé, 1835)
Lesina intermedia (Karny, 1923)
Lesina karnyi de Jong, 1942
Lesina lutescens Walker, 1869 - type species
Lesina vaginata Karny, 1923

Misidentification 
Lesina is often misidentified as Acridoxena, found in Africa.

References

External links 
 
 

Conocephalinae
Tettigoniidae genera
Insects of Asia